Andrej Drukarov (born 10 May 1999) is a Lithuanian alpine skier.

Career
In 2016 he competed at the 2016 Winter Youth Olympics. In 2018 Drukarov was selected to represent Lithuania in 2018 Winter Olympic Games. During Olympics Andrej finished 59th in giant slalom and 41st in men's slalom.

In 2017 Drukarov achieved a Lithuanian national record in slalom by reaching 45.64 FIS points. In 2019 Drukarov broken national record again with 23.24 FIS points in Giant Slalom. In 2021 skier broken this record again with 20.43.

Andrej Drukarov represented Lithuania at the FIS Alpine World Ski Championships 2021 in Cortina d'Ampezzo, Italy, where he finished 23rd in giant slalom. It is the best ever result for any Lithuanian alpine skier in world championships.

References 

Lithuanian male alpine skiers
Living people
1999 births
Alpine skiers at the 2016 Winter Youth Olympics
Alpine skiers at the 2018 Winter Olympics
Alpine skiers at the 2022 Winter Olympics
Olympic alpine skiers of Lithuania
Competitors at the 2023 Winter World University Games
Medalists at the 2023 Winter World University Games
Universiade medalists in alpine skiing
Universiade silver medalists for Lithuania